The decade of the 1270s in art involved some significant events.

Events

Architecture
Église Saint-Maurice, Soultz-Haut-Rhin started (completed in 1489)

Art
 1275: Cimabue completes Mezzo Crucifix

Births
 1272: Cao Zhibai – Chinese painter and bibliophile from the Yuan Dynasty (died 1355)
 c.1275: Lorenzo Maitani – Italian architect and sculptor primarily responsible for the construction and decoration of the façade of Orvieto Cathedral (died 1330)

Deaths
 1270: Mu Xi – Chinese landscape painter during the Song Dynasty (born 1210)
 1276: Coppo di Marcovaldo – Italian painter (born 1225)
 1278: Lanxi Daolong – Chinese Buddhist monk, calligrapher and philosopher (born 1213)
 1279: Wuzhun Shifan – Chinese painter, calligrapher, and prominent Zen Buddhist monk (born 1178)

 
Years of the 13th century in art
Art